Boyd Orr may refer to:

 John Boyd Orr (1880–1971), Scottish teacher, doctor, biologist and Nobel Peace Prize recipient
 Boyd Orr (politician) (born 1945), American politician in the Kansas House of Representatives